Sandy Martens (born 23 December 1972 in Opbrakel, East Flanders) is a retired Belgian football player. He is a former Belgium international, with a record of 3 goals in 11 games. He was a successful player for FC Bruges between 1998 and 2003 but suffered from various injuries later in his career. Originally a striker, he later played as a right back.

Career
Martens started off his career with Olsa Brakel, a club in Belgium's fourth division. In 1993, he moved to AA Gent (First Division, Jupiler League). In his first match, at home against SK Beveren, he scored immediately, making him a crowd's favourite. He remained one of the leading players in Gent until 1999.

In 1999 Martens moved to Club Brugge. It was also the period in which he turned Belgian international. He debuted for the Belgium national team on 27 March 1999 against Bulgaria. His last international appearance was against Croatia in August 2003.

Before 2012, Martens had the unique identification number of 0 in Sports Interactive's Football Manager series. For FM 2012, he was moved to id number 1.

Career statistics

Honours
Club Brugge
Belgian First Division A: 2002–03
Belgian Cup: 2001–02
Belgian Super Cup: 2002

References

External links
 

1972 births
Living people
Belgian footballers
Club Brugge KV players
Association football central defenders
K.A.A. Gent players
Belgium international footballers
K.S.K. Beveren players
Challenger Pro League players
Belgian Pro League players
Footballers from East Flanders